World Obstacle, institutional name Fédération Internationale de Sports d’Obstacles (FISO), is the international governing body for obstacle sports and related events. Disciplines include Ninja (similar to American Ninja Warrior), Obstacle Course Racing (OCR), and Adventure Racing (AR). Headquartered in Lausanne, Switzerland, it sanctions world and continental level events.

History 
The concept of an international governing body for Obstacle Racing was originally proposed by Joe DeSenna, the founder and owner of Spartan Race. This was announced in May, 2014 when world champion adventure athlete Ian Adamson accepted the job of leading the federation and sport, originally called the International Obstacle Racing Federation.

The organization filed as a Colorado non-profit sporting organization in early 2016 under the name the International Obstacle Sports Federation (IOSF). The decision was taken at the 4th Congress to establish headquarters in Lausanne, Switzerland to better represent the majority of member federations and be close to GAISF, WADA, CAS, the majority of international sporting federations and the IOC.

In February 2018, the organization filed in Switzerland as World OCR, the Fédération Internationale de Sports d’Obstacles (FISO), following the naming convention used by many international governing bodies such as FINA, FIFA, FIBA, FIS, World Sailing, World Rugby, World Rowing, World Archery,

Technology investor and media right entrepreneur Matthew Joynes was appointed the inaugural Secretary General of FISO, in 2018.

Inclusion of full medal events in the 2019 Southeast Asian Games was approved in December 2018. The SEA Games are under regulation of the Southeast Asian Games Federation (SEAGF) with supervision by the International Olympic Committee (IOC) and the Olympic Council of Asia (OCA). Six nations expressed intention to participate in the event. Four nations medaled, Philippines (10), Malaysia (4), Indonesia (3) and Laos (1)

World Obstacle signed a Memorandum of Understanding (MoU) with the International Parkour Federation (IPF) in August 2020 to unify Obstacle Sports worldwide under a governance structure similar to Aquatics (FINA), and constitution modeled on FINA and the World Baseball Softball Confederation (WBSC). The MoU expired in December 2020.

In order to provide more autonomous governance of obstacle sports worldwide, World OCR changed its name to World Obstacle in October 2020. This provided a more inclusive name for the core sports of Ninja, OCR and Adventure Racing.

World Obstacle is a member of the Alliance of Independent Recognized Members of Sports and was officially granted Observer Status by the Global Association of International Sports Federations (GAISF) Council which convened in Lausanne on 27 September 2021. GAISF consists of Olympic and non-Olympic International Federations and is regarded as one of the first points of contact towards any sport's potential Olympic recognition.

Members 

World Obstacle members are composed of National Member Federations administering Obstacle Sports in each country. Each National Federation (NF) belongs to one of the four Continental Confederations. Each of the Continental Confederation offers a Continental Championship. As of 2022, the continental confederations are:
Obstacle Sports Federation Africa, the Obstacle Sports Federation of Africa (OSFA) - 12 national federations
 The Pan American Obstacle Sports Federation (PAOSF) - 22 national federations
Obstacle Sports Federation Asia Pacific, the Obstacle Sports Federation Asia Pacific (OSFAP) - 30 national federations with sub-continental regions including Obstacle Sports Federation South East Asia, Obstacle Sports Federation Central and Western Asia, and Obstacle Sports Federation East & South Asia and Pacific.*
European Obstacle Sports Federation the European Obstacle Sports Federation (EOSF) - 30 national federations**. Sub continental associations for Nordic Countries (Denmark, Finland, Norway, Sweden) and Central Europe (Czech Republic, Hungary, Poland, and Romania) were initiated in 2022.

* Sub-continental regions for Asia-Pacific were formalized the 2021 OSFAP Congress.

** Originally formed an association of European organisations prior to the 1st OCR European Championships June 10–11, 2016, EOSF was incorporated as the European Obstacle Sports Federation on 8 April 2017 at Olbia, Sardegna, Italy.

Organization 
The Congress is the General Assembly of the member National Member Federations and the highest authority of World Obstacle. The Congress meets annually at a date and venue specified by the Executive Board and is the platform for representation of the needs and interests of the athletes.

World Obstacle's top-level executive branch, the Central Board's role is to supervise the practice of obstacles sports worldwide. It is composed of the President, the Secretary-General the Treasurer, the President of each Zone, one representative of each recognized league and two additional representatives from each zone. Zone representatives must include at least one female and one athlete, who can be the same person.

The Executive Committee manages the property and business of World Obstacle. The roles and responsibilities of the Executive Committee are to delegate the President and Secretary General to handle routine business and carry out decisions made by Executive Committee.

The organization of World Obstacle includes the following Commissions: Athletes, Governance, Legal, Medical, Para-athlete, Technical and Women's. All Commissions report to the Executive Board, and all Commission members have the right to attend Executive Board meeting. It is the responsibility of the members of each of the Commissions to support World Obstacle's efforts to develop Obstacle Sports.

The organization of World Obstacle includes the following Committees: Development, Ethics, Finance, Masters, Media, Officials, Safe Sport and Technology. Committees are advisory. It is the responsibility of the members of each of the Committees to support World Obstacle's efforts to develop Obstacle Sports.

Championships 
World-level events sanctioned, organised or recognized by World Obstacle include:
 Medal events in the 2019 Southeast Asian Games
Ninja World Championships
 UNAA Ninja World Series
UNAA Ninja World Series Finals
OCR European Championships
OCR Asian Championships.
 OCR Pan American Championships
 Altitude OCR World Championships also call the World's Highest OCR
 Youth OCR World Championships
 University OCR World Championships
 Beach OCR World Championships

OCR Brand** World Championships include:
 Spartan Race World Championships
 World's Toughest Mudder
OCR Series and World Finals
Adventurey OCR World Championships

**Commercial entities producing "World Championship Events"

References

International sports organizations
Obstacle racing
Sports governing bodies by sport